(born November 20, 1994) is a Japanese racing driver from Yokohama. He won the TCR Japan Saturday and Sunday Series in 2020, racing for Audi Team Hitotsuyama.

Racing record

Super GT

References

External links
 
 

1994 births
Living people
Sportspeople from Yokohama
Japanese racing drivers
Super GT drivers
Formula Regional Japanese Championship drivers